Panther Mountain can refer to:
Panther Mountain (Alberta), in Alberta, Canada
Panther Mountain (New York), in Ulster County, New York, United States
Panther Mountain (Franklin County, New York), in the Adirondacks
Panther Mountain (Herkimer County, New York), in towns of Ohio and Webb in Herkimer County, New York
Panther Mountain (Webb, Herkimer County, New York), in Town of Webb in Herkimer County, New York
Panther Mountain (Otsego County, New York), in Otsego County, New York